Elrod is a surname.  Notable people with the name may refer to:

 Arthur Elrod, American interior designer
 David Elrod, character in Altars of Desire
 David Elrod, musician in The Union Trade
 Henry Talmage Elrod, recipient of Medal of Honor
 Jack Elrod, American cartoonist
 Jon Elrod, Indiana politician
 Morton John Elrod, Montana ecologist
 P. N. Elrod, writer
 Richard Elrod, Illinois politician
 Samuel H. Elrod, South Dakota governor
 Elrod of Melvinbone, a character from Cerebus comics